Blackheath High School is an independent day school for girls in Blackheath Village in southeast London, England. It was founded in 1880 as part of the Girls' Day School Trust; the Senior School occupied a purpose-built site in Wemyss Road for over 110 years.

History
The school was set up in 1880 by the Girls' Public Day School Company. Sarah Allen Olney was the founding head. During her short leadership the school's role grew by a factor of four. Onlney resigned in 1886 to found another school with her sister Rebecca.

Location
The Senior Department is located in the former Church Army Wilson Carlile Training College (opened in 1965) in Vanbrugh Park after moving from the Wemyss Road site in Blackheath in 1993/4. The school building in Blackheath village then became the Junior department. The Vanburgh Park site includes the Church Army Chapel, a locally listed building (designed by architect Ernest Trevor Spashett) now used as a music room and dance studio. It was a state-funded direct grant grammar school (also known simply as direct grant schools) from the late 1940s until 1976.

School motto 
The school's motto is "Blackheath High School – a place to grow, a place to excel". Previously it had been "Knowledge no more a fountain sealed": a reference to the days when girls had poor access to schooling, as was the case in the early years of the school.

Notable former pupils

 Sophie Aldred, actress
 Isabel Appio, assistant music editor from 1986 to 1991 of Time Out
 Zeng Baosun, Chinese feminist, writer, and educator
 Prof Wendy Barclay, professor of influenza virology since 2007 at Imperial College London
 Phyllis Barclay-Smith CBE, ornithologist
 Lucy Boynton, actress
 The Reverend Prof Sarah Coakley (née Furber), theologian, Norris–Hulse Professor of Divinity since 2007 at the University of Cambridge
 Jean Cooke, artist
 Saffron Coomber, actress
 Evelyn Denington, Baroness Denington (née Bursill), chairman from 1966 to 1980 of Stevenage Development Corporation
 Prof Alison Finch, professor of French from 2000 to 2003 at the University of Oxford, and acting master of Churchill College, Cambridge in 2012
 Jessica Fellowes, author and journalist
 Margaret Jay, Baroness Jay of Paddington
 Prof Elizabeth Jeffreys, Bywater and Sotheby Professor of Byzantine and Modern Greek Language and Literature from 1996 to 2006 at the University of Oxford
 Deborah Lawrenson, novelist
 Helen Lederer, comedian
 Liv Little, founder of gal-dem 
 Fiona Maddocks, wife of Tom Phillips, chief music critic from 1997 to 2002 and since 2008 of The Observer, and founding editor from 1992 to 1997 of BBC Music Magazine
 Hilary Miller, artist
 Margaret Popham CBE, principal from 1937 to 1953 of Cheltenham Ladies' College
 Mary Quant, fashion designer
 Prof Anne Stevens, professor of European studies from 1998 to 2008 at Aston University, and from 1991 to 1998 at the University of Kent
 Dora Turnbull (née Elles), wrote under the pen-name Patricia Wentworth
 Lesley Vickerage, actress
 Charlene White, journalist
 Beth Willis (producer)
 Diane Yeo, wife of Tim Yeo, and UK director from 2001 to 2003 of UNHCR, and director from 2003 to 2005 of the Muscular Dystrophy Campaign

Published histories
.
.
 Allen, Dr Hillary (2005), Brief History of Blackheath High School GDST 1880–2005''. Retrieved 21 May 2008.

References

External links
School Website
Profile on the ISC website
ISI Inspection Reports

Private schools in the Royal Borough of Greenwich
Private girls' schools in London
Educational institutions established in 1880
Schools of the Girls' Day School Trust
Member schools of the Girls' Schools Association
Blackheath, London
1880 establishments in England